Dual specificity protein phosphatase 7 is an enzyme that in humans is encoded by the DUSP7 gene.

Function 

Dual-specificity phosphatases (DUSPs) constitute a large heterogeneous subgroup of the type I cysteine-based protein-tyrosine phosphatase superfamily. DUSPs are characterized by their ability to de-phosphorylate both tyrosine and serine / threonine residues. DUSP7 belongs to a class of DUSPs, designated MKPs, that dephosphorylate MAPK (mitogen-activated protein kinase) proteins ERK, JNK, and p38 with specificity distinct from that of individual MKP proteins. MKPs contain a highly conserved C-terminal catalytic domain and an N-terminal Cdc25-like (CH2) domain. MAPK activation cascades mediate various physiologic processes, including cellular proliferation, apoptosis, differentiation, and stress responses.

It is known to bind and dephosphorylate ErkII, and as it, along with the other members of the DUSP family expresses high selectively for MAP kinases, it has been suggested that it functions as a method for selectively activating/deactivating different members of that family.

References

Further reading

External links 
 PDBe-KB provides an overview of all the structure information available in the PDB for Human Dual specificity protein phosphatase 7 (DUSP7)

EC 3.1.3